The Priacanthiformes is a proposed order of marine ray-finned fishes. The order comprises two families, the Priacanthidae and the Cepolidae, which bear very little morphological similarity to each other but which have been shown to be sister taxa in repeated molecular analyses. The exact placement of the order within the series Eupercaria is incertae sedis. However, the more traditional classification followed in the 5th Edition of the Fishes of the World places both these families within the order Perciformes.

Families
The following two families are included in the Priacanthiformes: 

 Priacanthidae Günther, 1859 (Bigeyes)
 Cepolidae  Rafinesque, 1810 (Bandfishes)

In the 5th edition of Fishes of the World the Priacanthidae are in the suborder Percoidei but with the caveat that they may be more closely related to the Acanthuriformes while the Cepolidae are placed in the monotypic superfamily Cepoloidea.

References
  

Ray-finned fish orders
Taxa named by Pieter Bleeker